KSNM (98.7 FM, "Classic Rock 98.7") is a radio station licensed to serve Truth or Consequences, New Mexico.  The station is owned by Adams Radio Group, LLC, through licensee Adams Radio of Las Cruces, LLC.  It airs a classic rock format.  Its studios are located in Las Cruces and its transmitter is located in Caballo, New Mexico.

The station was assigned the KKVS call letters by the Federal Communications Commission on January 1, 2001.

Previous Logos

References

External links
KSNM official website

SNM